María Bertelloti (born 31 May 1980) is an Argentine swimmer. She competed in the women's 4 × 200 metre freestyle relay and women's 4 × 100 metre medley relay events at the 1996 Summer Olympics.

References

1980 births
Living people
Argentine female swimmers
Olympic swimmers of Argentina
Swimmers at the 1996 Summer Olympics
Place of birth missing (living people)
Argentine female freestyle swimmers